The Newport power stations supplied electricity to the town of Newport and the surrounding area from 1895 to the late 1970s. The original power station was in Llanarth Street which supplied electric lighting; a larger station, known as the East power station, was built in Corporation Road from 1903. They were owned and operated by Newport Corporation prior to the nationalisation of the British electricity supply industry in 1948. The East power station was redeveloped in the 1920s and 1940s to meet the increased demand for electricity.

History
In 1891 Newport Corporation applied for a Provisional Order under the Electric Lighting Acts to generate and supply electricity to the town. This was granted by the Board of Trade and was confirmed by Parliament through the Electric Lighting Orders Confirmation (No. 11) Act 1891 (54 & 55 Vict. c. cv). The original power station was built in Llanarth Street, Newport (51°35'12"N 02°59'35"W) and it first supplied electricity on 14 October 1895. Further equipment was added to meet the rising demand for electricity; by the 1920s it had a generating capacity of 600 kW.

A larger power station was built in Corporation Road (51°35'11"N 02°59'08"W) this was known as the East power station, on the east side of the River Usk. This supplied electricity to the Newport Corporation Tramways. The power station was expanded with new generating plant between 1925 and 1929 and again in 1941 and 1948. These additions brought the generating capacity to 80.5 MW. The East power station operated until the late 1970s

Equipment specification
The initial installation of plant at the Llanarth Street site in 1895 comprised horizontal compound engines coupled by ropes to Hall dynamos. The plant had a rating of 350 kW.

The station was supplied with coal via a siding off the nearby dockside railway sidings.

By 1922 the plant at Llanarth Street comprised boilers delivering 28,000 lb/h (3.53 kg/s) of steam to 2 × 300 kW reciprocating engines.

Plant in 1923
By 1923 the generating plant at the East power station comprised:

Coal-fired boilers generating up to 150,000 lb/h (18.9 kg/s) of steam which was supplied to:

Generators:

 1 × 200 kW reciprocating engine with DC generator
 1 × 300 kW reciprocating engine with DC generator
 2 × 500 kW reciprocating engines with DC generators
 1 × 1,500 kW steam turbo-alternator AC
 1 × 3,000 kW steam turbo-alternator AC
 1 × 3,750 kW steam turbo-alternator AC
 1 × 5,000 kW steam turbo-alternator AC.

These machines gave a total generating capacity of 14,750 kW comprising 13,250 kW of alternating current (AC) plus 1,500 kW of direct current (DC).

Electricity supplies to consumers were:

 200 & 100 Volts, single phase, 87.5 Hz AC (from Llanarth Street)
 200 & 100 Volts, single phase, 50 Hz AC
 400 & 230 Volts, 3-phase, 50 Hz AC
 460 & 230 Volts DC
 500 V DC Traction current

Plant in 1924–48
New plant was commissioned at the East power station in 1925 and 1929 (known as the low pressure plant), and again in 1941 and 1948 (high pressure plant). This comprised:

 Low pressure boilers:
 1 × Babcock & Wilcox 60,000 lb/h (7.56 kg/s) boiler, steam conditions 260 psi and 560°F (17.9 bar, 293°C)
 2 × Babcock & Wilcox 80,000 lb/h (10.08 kg/s) boilers, steam conditions 260 psi and 670°F (17.9 bar, 312°C)
 High pressure boilers:
 2 × Babcock & Wilcox 150,000 lb/h (18.9 kg/s) boilers, steam conditions 625 psi and 875°F (43.1 bar, 468°C)
 2 × Babcock & Wilcox 180,000 lb/h (22.7 kg/s) boilers, steam conditions 625 psi and 875°F (43.1 bar, 468°C)

The boilers supplied steam to:

 High pressure generators:
 2 × 30 MW Fraser-Chalmers/GEC turbo-alternator, generating at 6.2 and 11.8 kV, installed in 1941  and 1948
 Low pressure generators:
 1 × 10 MW Escher Wyss-Brown-Boveri turbo-alternator, generating at 6.2 kV, installed in 1925
 1 × 10 MW Escher Wyss-GEC Bellis turbo-alternator, generating at 6.2 kV, installed in 1929
 1 × 0.5 MW Allen-GEC house set

The station was supplied with coal via a siding off the nearby railway line.

Condenser cooling water was drawn from the tidal river at 5 million gallons per hour (6.31 m3/s).

Operations

Operating data 1898
Operating data for 1898 included: 
 Electricity sold: to consumers 99,410 kWh; for public lamps 96,522 kWh; total 195,932 kWh
 No. of lamps on circuits: 11,994
 No. of Public lamps: 42
 Revenue from sales of electricity was £3,467; the cost of generation was £1,599.

Operating data 1921–23
The electricity supply data for the period 1921–23 was:

The electricity loads on the system were:

Revenue from sales of current (in 1923) was £126,084; the surplus of revenue over expenses (1923) was £60,763.

By the late 1930s the supply area was 53 square miles (137 km2) and there were 25,000 consumers. The Corporation tramways ceased operating in September 1937.

Operating data 1946
Newport power station operating data for 1946 is:

The British electricity supply industry was nationalised in 1948 under the provisions of the Electricity Act 1947 (10 & 11 Geo. 6 c. 54). The Newport electricity undertaking was abolished, ownership of Newport power station was vested in the British Electricity Authority, and subsequently the Central Electricity Authority and the Central Electricity Generating Board (CEGB). At the same time the electricity distribution and sales responsibilities of the Newport electricity undertaking were transferred to the South Wales Electricity Board (SWEB).

Operating data 1954–72
Operating data for the period 1954–72 was:  

The output from the stations in MWh is shown on the graph.

Newport supply district
Following nationalisation Newport became an electricity supply district, covering 79.2 square miles (205 km2) with a population of 135,160 in 1958. The number of consumers and electricity sold in the Newport district was:

In 1958 the number of units sold to categories of consumers was:

Closure
Newport power station was decommissioned in the late 1970s. Some of the power station buildings were converted for commercial use and the area has been redeveloped with residential and commercial premises.

See also
 Timeline of the UK electricity supply industry
 List of power stations in Wales
 Newport Corporation Tramways

References

Demolished power stations in the United Kingdom
Buildings and structures in Newport, Wales
Energy infrastructure completed in 1895
1895 establishments in Wales
1970s disestablishments in Wales